Majed Hazazi (born July 1, 1988) is a Saudi Arabian football player who currently plays as a full back for Hajer.

He was a member of the Saudi football team in the 2010 FIFA World Cup qualification.

References

External links
 

Living people
1988 births
Saudi Arabia international footballers
Saudi Arabian footballers
Al Nassr FC players
Al-Taawoun FC players
Al-Raed FC players
Al-Fateh SC players
Ohod Club players
Damac FC players
Al-Jabalain FC players
Al-Orobah FC players
Hajer FC players
Association football fullbacks
Saudi Professional League players
Saudi First Division League players